Bosniak Democratic Union (BDZ) is a political party in Serbia, representing the Bosniak ethnic minority. It is led by Emir Elfić.

History 
It was founded on 25 December 2010 in Novi Pazar. Its founder and leader is economist Emir Elfić (as of 2016). The party led the All Together ethnic minority political alliance that participated in the 2012 parliamentary election. The alliance received 24,993 votes (0.63%) and 1 seat in the parliament. In the 2014 elections, the alliance received 3,983 votes (0.11%) and lost its seat. The alliance was dissolved. In March 2016, the BDZ and the Sandžak Democratic Party agreed on a coalition. It did not participate in the 2016 elections.

References

Sources

Bosniak political parties in Serbia
Political parties established in 2010
Novi Pazar
2010 establishments in Bosnia and Herzegovina